Jürgen Pahl (born 17 March 1956 in Teuchern, East Germany) is a German former football goalkeeper. He fled together with Norbert Nachtweih from a match of the East Germany under-21 team to West Germany and was subsequently banned for a year. He played from 1978 to 1987 in the Bundesliga for Eintracht Frankfurt and won the 1979–80 UEFA Cup and 1980–81 DFB-Pokal with them.

Pahl now lives in Paraguay.

See also
 List of Eastern Bloc defectors

References

1956 births
Living people
People from Teuchern
People from Bezirk Halle
German footballers
East German footballers
Footballers from Saxony-Anhalt
East Germany under-21 international footballers
Hallescher FC players
Eintracht Frankfurt players
Çaykur Rizespor footballers
Bundesliga players
East German defectors
Association football goalkeepers
Süper Lig players
German expatriate footballers
Expatriate footballers in Turkey
East German emigrants to West Germany
DDR-Oberliga players
UEFA Cup winning players
German expatriate sportspeople in Turkey